The Georgia Bulldogs swimming and diving team represents the University of Georgia (UGA) in NCAA men's and women's swimming and diving.  Also known as the "Swim Dawgs," the teams compete at  Gabrielsen Natatorium in Athens, Georgia, USA. The women have won seven NCAA national championships (1999, 2000, 2001, 2005, 2013, 2014, 2016). Jack Bauerle is the head coach over both the men's and women's swimming teams. Dan Laak is the head diving coach.

History
The men's team was formed in 1926 by Clarence Jones and practices were held in the Athens YMCA 20-yard pool. The men's team later moved to Stegeman Hall, an indoor athletics and training facility built during World War I and demolished in 1996. The women's team began competing in 1974. Both teams moved to their current facility, Gabrielsen Natatorium, in 1996.

The women's 1st-place finish in the 2016 Women's NCAA national championships was their 21st consecutive top-7 effort at that meet. The men's team has finished in the top 15 at Men's NCAA national championships every year since 1997. A 5th place showing at the 2016 Men's championship was the fourteenth top-ten finish for the men's team in its history.

Men’s team head coaches

Women’s team head coaches

Facilities

The Georgia Swimming and Diving program competes in Gabrielsen Natatorium located on the UGA campus.  The center opened in 1996 and has hosted competitions including the SEC Championships and NCAA Championships.

NCAA national team championships
The women's team has won seven NCAA national championships.

NCAA national championship meet history

Notable current and former team members

See also

References

External links
 NCAA women's swimming and diving
 NCAA men's swimming and diving